Housseine Zakouani Saïd (born 30 April 1998) is a professional footballer who plays as a forward for Championnat National 2 club Jura Sud. Born in France, he plays for the Comoros national team.

Career
On 11 October 2019, Zakouani joined Aubagne in the Championnat National 3.

International career
Zakouani was born in France and is of Comorian descent. He debuted for the Comoros national team in a 2–1 friendly win over Libya on 11 October 2020.

Career statistics

Club

References

External links
NFT Profile

1998 births
Living people
Comorian footballers
Comoros international footballers
French footballers
French sportspeople of Comorian descent
Association football forwards
Championnat National 2 players
Championnat National 3 players
Football League (Greece) players
Olympique de Marseille players
Trikala F.C. players
Aubagne FC players
Jura Sud Foot players
French expatriate footballers
French expatriate sportspeople in Greece
Expatriate footballers in Greece